Anthony Creek is a stream in the U.S. state of West Virginia. It is a tributary of the Greenbrier River.

According to tradition, the Anthony Creek has the name of John Anthony, a local Indian.

See also
List of rivers of West Virginia

References

Rivers of Greenbrier County, West Virginia
Rivers of Pocahontas County, West Virginia
Rivers of West Virginia